Joseph Clennell (19 February 1889 – 28 February 1965)  was an English footballer who played in the Football League for Blackpool, Blackburn Rovers, Everton, Cardiff City, Stoke City, Bristol Rovers and Rochdale.

Career
Clennell was born in New Silksworth, and spent his early career with Seaham White Star, Silksworth United and Seaham Harbour.

He began his professional career with Blackpool in 1910 and was top scorer for the Seasiders in 1910–11 scoring 19 goals, which attracted the attention of First Division clubs. Blackburn Rovers signed him in April 1911 and in his first full season at Ewood Park he won a First Division champions medal. Injuries restricted him to few appearances for Rovers and he joined Everton in January 1914, where he again won a First Division title in 1914–15, where he scored 14 goals. His career was interrupted by World War I but he resumed playing for Everton in 1919. He spent two more seasons at Goodison Park before leaving for Cardiff City in October. He was a very useful forward for the Bluebirds and very nearly helped them win the title in 1923–24 but they missed out to Huddersfield Town on goal average. After losing his place to Harry Beadles, he then played two seasons for Stoke City scoring 9 goals in 35 matches and ended his Football League career with Bristol Rovers and then Rochdale.

He later played for Ebbw Vale, Barry, Bangor, Distillery and Great Harwood.

Career statistics
Source:

Honours
 Blackburn Rovers
 Football League First Division champions: 1911–12

 Everton
 Football League First Division champions: 1914–15

References

1889 births
1965 deaths
English footballers
Association football forwards
Blackpool F.C. players
Blackburn Rovers F.C. players
Everton F.C. players
Cardiff City F.C. players
Stoke City F.C. players
Bristol Rovers F.C. players
Rochdale A.F.C. players
English Football League players
English Football League representative players
Ebbw Vale F.C. players
Barry Town United F.C. players
Bangor F.C. players
Lisburn Distillery F.C. players
Great Harwood F.C. players